Wild Mustang is a 1935 American Western film written and directed by Harry L. Fraser. The film stars Harry Carey, Barbara Fritchie, Del Gordon, Katheryn Johns, Bob Kortman, George Chesebro, Chuck Morrison, Dick Botiller, George Morrell	and Milburn Morante. The film was released on October 22, 1935, by Ajax Pictures Corporation.

Plot

Cast          
Harry Carey as Joe 'Wild Mustang' Norton
Barbara Fritchie as Jill McClay
Del Gordon as Reno Norton
Katheryn Johns as Ma McClay
Bob Kortman as Utah Evans 
George Chesebro as Deputy Tex Carter 
Chuck Morrison as Henchman 
Dick Botiller as Juan Romano Calinie 
George Morrell	as Sheriff Terry McClay
Milburn Morante as Steve Randall

References

External links
 

1935 films
1930s English-language films
American Western (genre) films
1935 Western (genre) films
Films directed by Harry L. Fraser
American black-and-white films
1930s American films